Romain Armand (born 27 February 1987) is a French professional footballer who plays for  club FC Versailles 78 as a forward.

Club career
In June 2022, Armand signed with Versailles.

References

External links
 Romain Armand profile at foot-national.com
 
 
 

Living people
1987 births
French footballers
Association football forwards
Ligue 1 players
Ligue 2 players
Championnat National players
Championnat National 2 players
Championnat National 3 players
Montpellier HSC players
Clermont Foot players
AS Cannes players
SR Colmar players
CS Sedan Ardennes players
US Orléans players
Gazélec Ajaccio players
Paris FC players
Pau FC players
FC Versailles 78 players